The Brunell House at 12113 Jessamine St. in Magnolia Springs, Alabama, is a house that was built in 1910.  It was listed on the National Register of Historic Places in 1995.

Architecture 
It is a vernacular cottage with elements of Classical Revival style, including Tuscan columns.

It was built probably as a rental cottage for Mr. Brunell.

Another NRHP-listed property in Magnolia Springs is also sometimes known as "Brunell House".  This is the Governor's Club, a resort hotel which stands on property assembled by Chicago businessman Frank Brunell during 1901 to 1908.

Brunell House is a contributing building in the Magnolia Springs Historic District, which was listed on the National Register in 2012.

References

External links

National Register of Historic Places in Baldwin County, Alabama
Houses completed in 1910
Neoclassical architecture in Alabama
1910 establishments in Alabama